Said Dghay (born 14 January 1964) is a Moroccan former footballer who played at international level, competing at the 1994 FIFA World Cup.

References

1964 births
Living people
Moroccan footballers
Morocco international footballers
1994 FIFA World Cup players
Association football goalkeepers
Botola players
Association football goalkeeping coaches